Barren Creek may refer to:

Barren Creek (Bear Creek tributary), a stream in Missouri
Barren Creek, West Virginia, an unincorporated community

See also
Barren Fork (disambiguation)